L.M. Montgomery's Anne of Green Gables is a Canadian television film based on Lucy Maud Montgomery's 1908 novel of the same name. It first aired on YTV on February 15, 2016 and starred Ella Ballentine, Martin Sheen and Sara Botsford. Montgomery's granddaughter, Kate Macdonald Butler, was one of the film's executive producers. The film's world premiere was held February 2, 2016 at the Canadian Museum of History.

The 90-minute film replaced the previously announced 13-part series that had been set to film in 2013. It was filmed in Milton, Ontario and Prince Edward Island.

Cast
Ella Ballentine as Anne Shirley
Martin Sheen as Matthew Cuthbert
Sara Botsford as Marilla Cuthbert
Julia Lalonde as Diana Barry
Kate Hennig as Rachel Lynde 
Stefani Kimber as Josie Pye
Drew Haytaoglu as Gilbert Blythe
Kyle Gatehouse as Mr. Phillips
Linda Kash as Mrs. Barry
Zoe Fraser as Ruby Gillis

International distribution
The film was released theatrically in Australia and New Zealand on June 9 and July 7, 2016, respectively, by Umbrella Entertainment. The company also released it on DVD on October 10, 2016. In the United Kingdom, the movie aired on ITV3 on August 28, 2016 and was later released on DVD on March 20, 2017 by Second Sight Films.

US rights were acquired by PBS, and the film was released on DVD on November 8, with the channel broadcasting it on November 24, 2016 (Thanksgiving Day). The network claims the television run was seen by more than 3.2 million viewers, with an additional 230,000 watching online.

The film has also seen a release in Germany, Poland, Hungary, the Czech Republic and Italy. In Japan, it was released theatrically on May 6, 2017 and later home video, by Happinet and Synergy Entertainment.

Sequels

On September 19, 2016, YTV's parent company, Corus Entertainment announced that they had approved two sequels; Anne of Green Gables: The Good Stars for broadcast in 2017, and Anne of Green Gables: Fire & Dew in 2018. The Good Stars premiered on February 20, 2017. Bumped up from its original 2018 release window, Fire & Dew premiered on July 1, 2017. PBS has also picked up both followups.

References

External links

Anne of Green Gables films
English-language Canadian films
2016 television films
2016 films
Canadian drama television films
Films directed by John Kent Harrison
2010s Canadian films